Floyd Britton (April 21, 1937 in Colon – November 29, 1969 in Coiba Island), perhaps Panama's most important leftist leader of the twentieth century, came from an immigrant black family that had come to Panama for better employment opportunities. A student leader from his days in secondary school, which he graduated in 1958, he participated in a failed guerrilla revolt the following year and then enrolled in the University of Panama.

He quickly became a leader of the militant Revolutionary Action Movement (RAM) and of the Federation of Students of Panama (FEP), organized anti-imperialist protests against U.S. colonialism, attended conferences in Cuba, and joined the People's Party of Panama, Panama's first and main Marxist party. Perhaps most significantly, Britton was one of the leaders of the protests  in 1964 that are today commemorated in the Day of the Martyrs holiday.

With politics heavily influenced both by Castro's revolution and Maoism, he broke with the People's Party, forming one of two leftist sects. On October 11, 1968, a military coup took power bringing General Omar Torrijos to power, and within hours Britton was abducted by the National Guard and sent to the Coiba penal colony. Hundreds of other leftists were also arrested at the demand of the CIA, most held for about a year. On November 29, 1969, Britton was beaten to death on Coiba, according to numerous witnesses. Panama's governments have long refused to disclose any details, and Britton's remains have never been found, although a search continues.

At the commencement of the coup, Britton's political group merged with others to form the November 29 National Liberation Movement (MLN-29) which briefly engaged in armed struggle against the military regime. MLN-29 is still a major leader of Panama's left, led by Britton's brother Federico Britton.

Hundreds of political adversaries and civilians suffered the same fate as Britton during the regime's period in power, with the number being unknown. 

1937 births
1969 deaths
Assassinated Panamanian politicians
Maoists
MLN-29 politicians
Panamanian people of African descent
People from Colón, Panama
People's Party of Panama politicians